Coleman Jacoby (April 16, 1915 October 20, 2010) was an American comedy writer for radio and television.

Early life
Born Coleman Jacobs in Pittsburgh, Pennsylvania, his father abandoned the family mother died when he was young.

He was raised at the Jewish Home for Babies and Children from age 7.

Career
After studying art, he moved to New York City, New York, where he worked painting murals for nightclubs. He also started writing jokes for comedians. Joke writing for Bob Hope and Fred Allen paved the way for steady work in radio. He changed his name to Jacoby on the recommendation of columnist Earl Wilson.

He wrote for Sid Caesar and Imogene Coca on Your Show of Shows. Later, after teaming up with his longtime partner Arnie Rosen, he wrote extensively for Jackie Gleason and Art Carney. The team also wrote for  Phil Silvers's character Sergeant Ernie Bilko for You'll Never Get Rich (later renamed The Phil Silvers Show).

Personal life
Jacoby was married twice, first to Violeta Velero in 1940, from whom he divorced, and later to Gaby Monet, who predeceased him. He had one daughter.

He died of pancreatic cancer in East Meadow, New York.

See also

 Lists of American writers
 List of Long Islanders
 List of people from the Pittsburgh metropolitan area

References

External links
 

1915 births
2010 deaths
20th-century American writers
21st-century American writers
American comedy writers
American radio writers
American television writers
American male television writers
Deaths from cancer in New York (state)
Deaths from pancreatic cancer
Emmy Award winners
People from East Meadow, New York
Writers from Pittsburgh
20th-century American male writers
Screenwriters from New York (state)
Screenwriters from Pennsylvania